"I Like" is a song by American artist Montell Jordan and Slick Rick that appeared both on Montell's second album, More... and the Nutty Professor soundtrack. Co-produced by Derick "D Man" McElveen and James Earl Jones, "I Like" became a hit in both the US, where it peaked at 28 on the Billboard Hot 100, and the UK, where it peaked at 24 on the UK Singles Chart. "I Like" was also Slick Rick's first single since his release from prison.

Single track listing

A-Side
"I Like" (LP Version)- 4:44  
"I Like" (Radio Edit)- 4:10

B-Side
"I Like" (TV track)- 4:44  
"I Like" (A Cappella)- 4:44  
"Come Around"- 3:55 (Dos of Soul)

Charts

Weekly charts

Year-end charts

References

1996 singles
Montell Jordan songs
Slick Rick songs
Songs written by Montell Jordan
Songs written by Slick Rick